SFU may refer to:

Universities
 Saint Francis University, in Loretto, Pennsylvania, United States
 Siberian Federal University, in Krasnoyarsk, Russia
 Sigmund Freud University Vienna, two private universities in Vienna, Austria and Paris, France
 Simon Fraser University, a Canadian public university in Burnaby, British Columbia, Canada
 Simon Fraser University Pipe Band, Grade 1 pipe band associated with the university

Government parties/societies
 Youth of the Socialist People's Party (Socialistisk Folkepartis Ungdom), a Danish socialist youth organization
 Societe Francaise des Urbanistes, a French society of Urban planners

Other
 Services for UNIX, a software package providing a Unix-like environment within Microsoft Windows
 Six Feet Under (disambiguation)
 Solar flux unit, a unit of incident solar energy falling on a surface
 Soul Flower Union, a Japanese musical group
 Star Fleet Universe, a variant of the Star Trek universe